Mammoth central is a paleontological site on the grounds of the Santa Lucía Airport in the state of Mexico, Mexico which contains the remains of at least 200 Columbian mammoths as well as 25 camels and five horses. The site is the world's largest concentration of mammoth remains; the previous was The Mammoth Site in South Dakota with only 61 individuals. Human tools and carved bones have also been discovered at the site, suggesting that humans utilized the site to trap and kill large mammals. More fossils continue to be found at the site. The dig will end in 2022, when the airport's construction is projected to conclude.

History 
The site is believed to have been the boggy shores of an ancient lake bed where animals were trapped 10,0000 to 20,000 years ago. Human tools have been found at the site. Some have hypothesized that humans drove the mammoths into the area to kill them. Archaeologist Rubén Manzanilla López, of the Instituto Nacional de Antropología e Historia, has also reported that the mammoths appeared to have been "carved up" by humans. It remains unclear whether the mammoths died of natural causes and were then carved by humans. The site is only  from artificial pits which were once used by humans to trap and kills large mammals.

Discovery 

The site was discovered during the construction of Mexico City Santa Lucía Airport. Due to the frequency of remains and artifacts, all bulldozers and construction workers are accompanied by archeologists. Construction has been stopped multiple times for further excavations.

Significance 
Researchers hope that the site will reveal the main causes of the extinction of the Columbian mammoth. Paleontologist Joaquin Arroyo Cabrales believes that the site will reveal that there was a "synergy effect between climate change and human presence."

See also 
 La Brea Tar Pits
 List of mammoth specimens
 Waco Mammoth National Monument

References

External links
 Associated Press video report of finding

Paleontology in Mexico
Pleistocene paleontological sites of North America
Archaeological sites in Mexico